Olivia Katarina Sudjic (born 1988) is a British fiction writer whose first book Sympathy received positive reviews in the press, from publications such as the New York Times, The Guardian and The New Republic.

Background

Sudjic was born in London, England, daughter of the art writer and critic Deyan Sudjic and lifestyle editor (including for Condé Nast Traveller magazine) and brand consultant Sarah Miller, daughter of architect and professor of architecture at the Royal College of Art John Miller and stepdaughter of his wife, the architect and designer Su Rogers. She was educated at the City of London School for Girls and then read English Literature at Trinity Hall, Cambridge where she won the E.G. Harwood Prize for English.

Sympathy (2017)
Sympathy revolves around a twenty-something woman visiting New York who becomes obsessed with an older woman via the social media app Instagram. The book is recognized for addressing generational differences:  "A child of the age of algorithms, she notices everything but knows the value and significance of nothing."  As for the structure, it resembles the disjointed experience of surfing the internet, thereby reinforcing the story's focus on technology.

The reviews for Sympathy have been enthusiastic. The New Republic refers to the novel as "a remarkable debut, and with the arrival of such a novelist we can finally welcome our techno-dystopian future with open arms." According to The New Republic, Sympathy is "The First Great Instagram Novel", dealing with obsession and smartphone technology.  The article goes on to say: "Rarely do novels so ostentatiously of the moment succeed so well at gesturing to the universal."  The novel was also mentioned in Vanity Fair, The Financial Times, The Spectator, The Telegraph, Elle, Esquire, Star Tribune, The Times, The New Yorker and Vice, among others.

Sudjic began writing Sympathy in 2014 while staying with her grandmother in Manhattan. New York City ended up becoming integral to the story, representing the protagonist's "...searching and longing for connection."  In the beginning, Sudjic intended to write an historical novel, but changed her mind and set the story in contemporary times. Sympathy has been described as a feminist work, with Sudjic stating that the internet is male dominated.

Exposure (2018)
Sudjic's second book, Exposure, was published on 1 November 2018 by Peninsula Press.

Asylum Road (2021)
Sudjic's third novel, Asylum Road, was published on 21 January 2021 by Bloomsbury. The narrator, Anya, is from Sarajevo, and survived the siege of that city; the novel is about her disintegration. The title refers to the street in Peckham on which the former asylum was located.

Asylum Road was shortlisted for the Royal Society of Literature's 2022 Encore Award and the Society of Authors' 2022 Gordon Bowker Volcano Prize.

References

External links

1988 births
Living people
21st-century British women writers
21st-century British novelists
Writers from London
21st-century Serbian women writers
Serbian novelists
British people of Serbian descent
People educated at the City of London School for Girls
Serbian women novelists